Rolling Blackouts is the third studio album by English band The Go! Team. It was released by Memphis Industries on 31 January 2011 in the United Kingdom and on 1 February 2011 in the United States.

Reception

Rolling Blackouts currently holds a score of 73 on the review aggregate website Metacritic, indicating "generally positive reviews".

Track listing

Sample credits
 "T.O.R.N.A.D.O." contains samples of "Beaten Metal", written by Stuart Bogie and Aaron Johnson, and performed by Antibalas.
 "Secretary Song" contains samples of "How Do You Like It?", written by Eddie Lashea and performed by The Sheppards; and "Acapulco Background Music", written and performed by Piero Piccioni.
 "Apollo Throwdown" contains samples of "The Birds", written and performed by Harry Nilsson.
 "Bust-Out Brigade" contains samples of "You're Right Ray Charles", written and performed by Joe Tex.
 "Voice Yr Choice" contains samples from "Different Strokes (B.E.T.)", written and performed by Syl Johnson; and "Remember the Rain", written by Marvin Smith and performed by 21st Century.
 "Yosemite Theme" contains samples of "Yeh Ladka Hai Allah Kaisa Hai Diwana", written by Majrooh Sultanpuri and R. D. Burman, and performed by Mohammed Rafi; and "Ab To Hai Tum Se", written by Majrooh Sultanpuri and S. D. Burman, and performed by Lata Mangeshkar.
 "Back Like 8 Track" contains samples of "Tèmèlès" and "Tèy Geryèlèshem", written by Alèmayèhu Eshète and performed by Eshète and Hirut Bekele.

Personnel
Credits for Rolling Blackouts adapted from album liner notes.

The Go! Team
 Jamie Bell
 Sam Dook
 Ninja
 Ian Parton
 Chi Fukami Taylor
 Kaori Tsuchida

Additional musicians
 Yuko Araki – performance on "Secretary Song"
 Bethany Cosentino – performance on "Buy Nothing Day" and "Rolling Blackouts"
 Angèle David-Guillou – performance on "The Running Range"
 Marina Gasolina – performance on "The Running Range"
 The Girls at Dawn – performance on "Buy Nothing Day"
 Lispector – performance on "Ready to Go Steady"
 The London African Gospel Choir – performance on "The Running Range"
 Satomi Matsuzaki – performance on "Secretary Song"
 The Pink Diamonds – performance on "Back Like 8 Track"
 Dominique Young Unique – performance on "Apollo Throwdown" and "Voice Yr Choice"
 Franklin Anane
 Daniel Baboulene
 Samuel Byard
 Laurie Carpenter
 Sophia Gore
 Crystal Hardwicke
 Yeelen Hardwicke
 Sam Hiscox
 Lewis Husbands
 Gary Kavanagh
 Micki Lekoma
 Ollie Malley
 Lashelle McDonald
 Angel Mhlanga
 James SK Wān
 Gloria Moyo
 Mbombo Nfumi
 Samantha Pugh
 Luke Rhoden
 Noly Sithole
 William Wells
 Rebecca Wheddon

Production
 Guy Davie – mastering
 The Go! Team – production
 Gareth Parton – production
 Sam Williams – additional mixing

Artwork and design
 James Taylor – artwork

Charts

References

External links
 
 

2011 albums
The Go! Team albums
Memphis Industries albums
Avant-pop albums